The Phobjikha Valley ཕོབ་སྦྱིས་ཁ spelled as Pho-sbis-kha, (the suffix kha is an element in many place-names in Bhutan and its use is generally optional both in colloquial speech and in literary forms) is a vast U-shaped valley in central Bhutan. The valley houses one of the impressive ancient Buddhist monasteries in Bhutan known as Gangteng Monastery of the Nyingma sect in central Bhutan. The graceful black-necked cranes in Bhutan (Grus nigricollis) from the Tibetan Plateau visit the valley during the winter season to roost. On arrival in the Phobjikha Valley in the last week of October, the black-necked cranes circle the Gangteng Monastery three times and also repeat the process while returning to Tibet.

The broad valley with its best-known marshland in Bhutan, is popular for its scenic splendour and cultural uniqueness. The valley is rich in faunal biodiversity and has, apart from the globally threatened black-necked cranes Grus nigricollis, 13 other globally threatened species. Within the ambit of the valley, an area of about  has been declared a protected area, which is managed by the Royal Society for the Protection of Nature (RSPN), for the protection of nature, authorized to manage, on lease basis, by the Ministry of Agriculture.

Tsechu, the colourful Mask Dance Festival of Bhutan and the Crane Festival welcoming the black-neck cranes in winter months are held every year in the precincts of the Phobjikha Valley, in the Gangten Monastery courtyard. It also has a popular 3-days trek route.

Etymology
The Western regions of Bhutan has been exposed to the visitors and traders around 11 Century AD. This brought significant exposure to these areas which brought economic, social and religious gains. These benefits have enabled them to incorporate enormous Buddhist Dharma language into their dialect. The people were called as Ngalong meaning early riser and the language called as Ngalong Kha. On the contrary, the Phobjikha Valley have been referred to as Ngoen Lung which refers to the settlements that pre-existed the rise from the darkness. The valley has been known by the name Lhoma Ngönlung in the 13th century when the Bon religion was predominant in the valley. Longchen Rabjam, a buddhist lama who visited Bhutan also established the Ngenlung Drechagling in valley in the 14th century. Even during that time the valley was known as Ngenlung.

It is however not clear as to how the valley got its present name but few local stories relate to the Buddhist Lama Drukpa Kunley and another story relates to the Gesar of Ling.

Geography

The valley covers most of Phobji and Gangteng Gewogs and some parts of Athang Gewog and contains the Gangteng Monastery, also known as Gangtey Gonpa, on a spur surrounded by the village Gangtey. The valley also hosts one of the eight Lings built by a great Buddhist saint Longchenpa which is called Ngenlung Drechagling. The valley is covered by a rich sward of grass in the marshy land where special variety of dwarf bamboo (Yushania microphylla) grows on which the black-necked cranes feed. The Nake Chuu and Phag Chuu River runs through this valley. Scenic views of the Phobjikha Valley are best below the spur of Gangteng Monastery and the other side of the valley in the east.

Climate
The valley is enclosed by the mountain ranges, which experience snowfall. The valley also gets covered with snow during the winter months forcing people of the valley to shift to more pleasant climes during the months of January and February.

Topography and drainage
The Phobjikha Valley is aligned northwest-southeast and composed of two major lateral valleys.

Economy

The Phobjikha Valley, with its agrarian economy, is mostly underdeveloped with least modern facilities of water and sanitation. Transport and communication facilities are also not adequate. But with the development of the country, the two mobile service providers of the country established the cellular networks. This connected the valley to the rest of the world. B-Mobile installed its first cellular network in the year 2008 during the consecration ceremony of the newly built Gangteng Monastery. In view of protection provided to the cranes which visit the valley in winter, as a conservation measure overhead transmission lines for electric supply have not been permitted to be provided. Solar heaters, solar powered cells and diesel generators are used to provide electricity in the past but now the valley is connected to the national grid using underground electrical cable system.

Demographics
The Phobjikha Valley is located in the Wangdue Phodrang District (Phobji and Gangteng Gewogs) in central Bhutan. The valley has about 4,500 people (4,716 has been reported) residing in Gangten and other villages, and in the Gangten Monastery that is strategically located on a spur above the valley.

Ethnicity
Two major ethnic groups reside within the valley. The major ethic group of the people living in the valley has a special identity and their language is a dialect known as Henkha or Nyenkha (inferred to be archaic Tibetan), a language under the Bumthang group of languages. The Henkha is a dialect restricted to certain pockets of the Trongsa and Wangdue Phodrang Districts. Henkha means the early language and the speakers of dialect are confined to the northern, eastern and western areas surrounding the Black Mountains range.

 
The latter ethnic group is those of Ngalong origin speaking the Ngalong Kha which is the same as the Dzongkha.

The Black Mountain Region is also inhabited by nomadic shepherds and yak-herders. The ancient animistic religion of Bhutan namely, the Bon religion, is still practiced by some of the villagers.

Flora and Fauna

The picturesque Phobjika Valley, in the backdrop of the Black Mountain Range, has a rich biodiversity of flora and fauna. This, coupled with the religious importance of the Gangten Monastery, has attracted religious and ecotourism to the valley.

 Vegetation
The Phobjika valley is marshy land and has a sward of grassy pastures where cattle and horses graze. A special kind of dwarf bamboo grows here, which attracts the black-necked cranes to roost and feed in the valley during the winter season. Potatoes are the main cash crop grown in the valley. Turnips are also grown. Other tree species seen are coniferous vegetation of blue pine, birch, maple and several species of rhododendrons.

 Crops
The valley is known for its seed potato crop as the soil and atmospheric conditions in the valley are free from insects and diseases that normally affect this crop. The crop is mainly exported to India where there is great demand for this variety. This has generated interest in the valley to convert the wetlands or marshy lands of the valley into farms by draining the area of its water logging to produce cash crops. However, interest to preserve the habitat of the black-necked crane in the valley, the religious significance that is attached to the black-necked cranes, and the tourism that has developed around the famous Gangten Monastery and the cranes, the institutions like the Royal Society for the Protection of Nature (RSPN) have prevailed upon the Government of Bhutan to stop any conversion of the valley land into farms. Palje "Benjie" Dorji, former Chief Justice of Bhutan, former Minister for Environment, and uncle of the present King of Bhutan, as the Chairman of the Royal Bhutan Society and as the founder of the Black-necked Conservation Programme helped to drop the proposal to drain the wetlands of the Phobjika Valley to create farms to grow cash rich seed potatoes. However, it has been suggested that as cranes are valued more, the people who cannot grow cash-rich potatoes here need to be compensated. It has also been suggested that the effect of tourism on cranes in the Phobjika Valley should also be studied.

Fauna
The valley and hills surrounding it are rich in wildlife. The fauna recorded are the muntjacs (barking deer), wild boars, sambar, Himalayan black bear, Himalayan serow, leopards and foxes.

Avifauna
The Phobjika Valley has several vulnerable species of birds in the Protected Conservation Area established in 2003. The most celebrated species of the region is the black-necked crane. RSPN is involved not only in the conservation management of the black-necked cranes and their habitat but also in conducting research on public education and awareness, community empowerment for conservation, and integrated conservation and development programmes, including community-based ecotourism in the valley. The black-necked cranes arrive in this valley in late October and depart in mid-February.

Festivals

Black-necked Crane Festival
In the Phobjikha valley, in particular, the black-necked cranes have a celebrity status, as witnessed by the Crane Festival held every year on 12 November, soon after their arrival from the Tibetan Plateau in late October. The festival is celebrated in the courtyards of the Gangten Gonpa and in the entire Phobjikha Valley. The festival is attended by a large number of local people. On this occasion, children wearing crane costumes perform choreographed crane dances. During this period, cranes are seen flying at high altitudes over the mountains. Many tourists also visit the valley to witness this festival.

Gangtey Tshechu

Another special festival observed by the people of the valley is the annual Tsechu, which is held in the Gangteng Monastery from the 5th to 10th days of the eighth lunar month, as per the Bhutanese calendar. Mask dances are a special feature of the festival. The festival attracts many foreign tourists.

Khewang Lhakhang Tshechu

Buddhist Temples

Kumbu Lhakhang
The epithet Kumbu could have been derived from Kumbu Bja which is the name of a cliff above the village. The name "Kumbu" have been a derivative name from "Kubum" meaning a hundred thousand statues. The local people have a strong belief that the cliff actually contains a thousand statues. 
The Kumbu Lhakhang is located on the northern side of the Gangteng Gonpa. The temple was originally built as a bonpo temple by Zhabdrung Tshanden Dulwa in the thirteenth century. He was a bonpo lama. Another temple was founded by him at Sewagang in Nyisho in Wangdue Phodrang. The temple is believed to be the residing place of the Ma Sripa Gyalmo, the Bonpo religious protectress.

Ngenlung Drechagling

Ngenlung Drechagling Lhakhang is one of the eight temples built by Kuenkhen Longchen Rabjam who is popularly known as Longchenpa.

The Ngenlung Drechagling Complex

Damche Lhakhang
Damche Lhakhang or Damchoe Lhakhang was founded and constructed by Trulku Paljor Gyeltshen who was the son of Longchen Rabjam in the 14th century.

Khewang Lhakhang
This temple is located to the north of Tabiting and southwest of Gophu village. It is located on the valley floor. Built in the 15th century, the temple features three stories with each story featuring present, past, and future  Buddhas. The temple was built by Trulku Paljor Gyeltshen.

Institutions

Education

Phobjikha Central School

Bayta Primary School

Rameychen Primary School

Gangphel Extended Classroom

Monastic Schools

Do-ngag Tösam Rabgayling
This institution is a Nyingma monastic college or shedra.

Shechen Nunnery
This institute is located between Kilkhorthang and Nimphey villages.

Health Care Centres
The health care centre in the valley mainly consists of a hospital and a few outreach clinics. Phobjikha hospital is located at Yuesa near the Phobjikha Central School.

Renewable Natural Resources Center

Nature/environmental Conservation

Royal Society for Protection of Nature

Phobjikha Forest Beat

Trekking/hiking trails
Phobjikha Valley trek is popular trekking that takes three days to complete and is part of the religious tourism and ecotourism that is promoted by the Government of Bhutan and other concerned NGO organizations.

Gangtey treks are also popular tourist attractions in the Phobjikha Valley, which covers the Gangteng Gonpa. These trekking routes followed by international trekking enthusiasts start from the Gangteng Gonpa in the Phobjikha Valley. The treks pass through the Kumbu village (east of the Gonpa), goes through the Gedachen and Khebayathang villages, lead to the Kilhorthang village, and terminate in the Kilkhortang Lhakhang. A short trek of about 90 minutes known as the 'Gangte Nature Trail' starts from the Mani stone wall to the north of the Gangteng Gonpa and ends in Khewa Lhakhang.

Gallery

See also
Royal Society for the Protection of Nature (RSPN)
Black Mountains (Bhutan)

References

Valleys of Bhutan
Ramsar sites in Bhutan
Important Bird Areas of Bhutan